Prof. Dr. Adriaan Kortlandt (25 January 1918, Rotterdam - 18 October 2009, Amsterdam) was a Dutch ethologist.

He was famous for his work on displacement activities (Dutch: overspronggedrag) and the hierarchy of instincts. Already in the thirties he realised the common characteristics between instincts in humans and other animals. In one of his experiments in Western Africa he exposed a stuffed panther with an electronic moving head to chimpanzees, who attacked it with sticks, thus illustrating to which extent early man could have kept wild animals at bay even before spears and other weapons were invented.

He also was the author of the "Rift Valley theory", better known under the name given by French paleoanthropologist Yves Coppens: "East Side Story".

References

Select publications
 Kleindienst, M. R., Burton, F. D., & Kortlandt, A. (1975). On new perspectives on ape and human evolution. Current Anthropology, 16(4), 644-651.

External links

1918 births
2009 deaths
20th-century Dutch zoologists
Human evolution theorists
Ethologists
Scientists from Rotterdam
Dutch anthropologists
20th-century anthropologists